Leptochilus is a fern genus in the family Polypodiaceae, subfamily Microsoroideae, according to the Pteridophyte Phylogeny Group classification of 2016 (PPG I).

Taxonomy
A molecular phylogenetic study of the subfamily Microsoroideae in 2019 suggested that the genus was monophyletic, being sister to Microsorum, together forming one of the three main clades in the subfamily:

Species
The Pteridophyte Phylogeny Group classification of 2016 (PPG I) suggests that the genus contains about 10 species. , the Checklist of Ferns and Lycophytes of the World noted that the species circumscription was "fairly controversial and fluctuating", and accepted 34 species and hybrids:

Leptochilus axillaris (Cav.) Kaulf.
Leptochilus bolsteri (Copel.) Parris
Leptochilus cantoniensis (Baker) Ching
Leptochilus chilangensis (V.N.Tu) Liang Zhang & Li Bing Zhang
Leptochilus chingii Liang Zhang & Li Bing Zhang
Leptochilus chittagongensis Fraser-Jenk. & Gias
Leptochilus decurrens Blume
Leptochilus digitatus (Baker) Noot.
Leptochilus dissimilialatus (Bonap.) Liang Zhang & Li Bing Zhang
Leptochilus dolichopterus (Copel.) Fraser-Jenk. & Amoroso
Leptochilus ellipticus (Thunb.) Noot.
Leptochilus evrardii (Tardieu) Liang Zhang & Li Bing Zhang
Leptochilus flexilobus (Christ) Liang Zhang & Li Bing Zhang
Leptochilus fluviatilis (Lauterb.) Liang Zhang & Li Bing Zhang
Leptochilus hemionitideus (C.Presl) Noot.
Leptochilus henryi (Baker) X.C.Zhang
Leptochilus heterophyllus (S.K.Wu & P.K.Lôc) comb. ined.
Leptochilus insignis (Blume) Fraser-Jenk.
Leptochilus lanceolatus Fée
Leptochilus leveillei (Ching) X.C.Zhang
Leptochilus macrophyllus (Blume) Noot.
Leptochilus mengsongensis M.X.Zhao
Leptochilus minor Fée
Leptochilus morsei (Ching) Fraser-Jenk.
Leptochilus × nepalensis Fraser-Jenk.
Leptochilus oblongus Li Bing Zhang, Liang Zhang & N.T.Lu
Leptochilus pedunculatus (Hook. & Grev.) Fraser-Jenk.
Leptochilus pentaphyllus (Baker) Liang Zhang & Li Bing Zhang
Leptochilus poilanei (C.Chr. & Tardieu) Liang Zhang & Li Bing Zhang
Leptochilus pothifolius (Buch.-Ham. ex D.Don) Fraser-Jenk.
Leptochilus pteropus (Blume) Fraser-Jenk.
Leptochilus saxicola (H.G.Zhou & Hua Li) Liang Zhang & Li Bing Zhang
Leptochilus × shintenensis (Hayata) Nakaike
Leptochilus wrightii (Hook.) X.C.Zhang

References

Polypodiaceae
Fern genera
Taxonomy articles created by Polbot